Norton is a city in, and the county seat of, Norton County, Kansas, United States.  As of the 2020 census, the population of the city was 2,747.

History

Norton was founded in 1872. Like the county, it was named for Capt. Orloff Norton.

The first hotel was a log house, built in 1873.

One of the first recorded tornado pictures was taken in Norton, in 1909, by photographer Will Keller.

Geography
Norton is located at  (39.833338, -99.890899). The city is situated on the north side of Prairie Dog Creek in Norton County. Before the Bureau of Reclamation constructed Keith Sebelius Lake in 1963, Norton was prone to frequent flooding.

Climate
Norton is on the boundary of two climate zones, humid continental and semiarid.  Temperatures can fluctuate drastically between the winter and summer seasons with average lows of 15 °F in January to average highs of 94 °F in July.  Precipitation is relatively low with an average yearly rainfall of 21.1 inches.  Snowfall throughout the year averages , however, because of its location on the high plains, snowfall totals can sometimes approach the yearly average after a single snowfall.

Demographics

2010 census
As of the census of 2010, there were 2,928 people, 1,290 households, and 763 families residing in the city. The racial makeup of the city was 96.8% White, 0.2% African American, 0.1% Native American, 0.4% Asian, 0.5% from other races, and 1.9% from two or more races. Hispanic or Latino of any race were 3.3% of the population.

There were 1,290 households, of which 26.3% had children under the age of 18 living with them, 46.5% were married couples living together, 9.3% had a female householder with no husband present, 3.3% had a male householder with no wife present, and 40.9% were non-families. 36.1% of all households were made up of individuals, and 18.3% had someone living alone who was 65 years of age or older. The average household size was 2.20 and the average family size was 2.86.

The median age in the city was 44.8 years. 23.2% of residents were under the age of 18; 6.4% were between the ages of 18 and 24; 20.6% were from 25 to 44; 27.8% were from 45 to 64; and 22% were 65 years of age or older. The gender makeup of the city was 46.6% male and 53.4% female.

2000 census
As of the census of 2000, there were 3,012 people, 1,331 households, and 814 families residing in the city. The racial makeup of the city was 97.91% White, 0.40% Native American, 0.33% Asian, 0.03% African American, 0.03% Pacific Islander, 0.63% from other races, and 0.66% from two or more races. Hispanic or Latino of any race were 2.03% of the population.

There were 1,331 households, out of which 27.7% had children under the age of 18 living with them, 50.5% were married couples living together, 8.5% had a female householder with no husband present, and 38.8% were non-families. 36.1% of all households were made up of individuals, and 20.7% had someone living alone who was 65 years of age or older. The average household size was 2.19 and the average family size was 2.86.

In the city, the population was spread out, with 24.5% under the age of 18, 5.3% from 18 to 24, 23.5% from 25 to 44, 22.1% from 45 to 64, and 24.6% who were 65 years of age or older. The median age was 43 years. For every 100 females, there were 91.5 males. For every 100 females age 18 and over, there were 82.9 males.

The median income for a household in the city was $30,339, and the median income for a family was $36,179. Males had a median income of $25,943 versus $20,559 for females. The per capita income for the city was $16,438. About 5.5% of families and 9.5% of the population were below the poverty line, including 10.4% of those under age 18 and 6.5% of those age 65 or over.

Education
The community is served by Norton USD 211 public school district.

Eisenhower Elementary School Constructed in 1954 and added on to in 1966 and 1990, Eisenhower Elementary serves students in USD 211 in grades ECD through sixth grade.  Full day, every day kindergarten is offered as is a full range of special education services. Grades ECD through four are taught in  self-contained  classrooms.  Grades 5 & 6 are departmentalized for instruction in math, reading, science, language arts and computer technology. Each teacher also teaches social studies and spelling to their homeroom students.

Norton Junior High School  Constructed in 1937 and extensively remodeled in 1984, Norton Junior High School serves the 120+ students in grades 7 & 8.  In addition to required classes of math, language arts, physical education/ health, science and social studies each junior high student receives 3 semesters of instruction in computer technology and digital media production and one semester of technology exploration (robotics, pneumatics, electronics, etc.).  Elective classes are offered in vocal music, instrumental music, art, wood working, and family and consumer sciences.

Norton Community High School  Constructed in 1975 & 1977,  NCHS is a 3A high school with an enrollment of 200+.  A comprehensive high school, NCHS is able to offer instruction in the areas of calculus, physics, human anatomy, chemistry II and foreign language.  In addition to the regular academic curriculum, NCHS offers fine arts and vocational training.

The Norton Community High School Bluejays have won 17 Kansas State High School Activities Association state championships in wrestling, including six consecutive Class 3-2-1A state championships from 2012–17, and three consecutive Class 3-2-1A championships in 2004-06. Norton's football team won back-to-back Class 4A state championships in 1985 and 1986, and finished as state runners-up in 1989. The girls basketball and boys basketball teams won state championships in 1983 and 2003, respectively, and have made numerous state tournament appearances. NCHS also boasts programs in girls tennis, girls volleyball, boys golf, cross country, and track and field.

Notable people
 Nick Allen, baseball player
 William B. Ryan, mayor of Norton, attorney, Kansas state Senator, Kansas state district court judge
 Kathleen Sebelius (nee Gilligan), the former Secretary of Health and Human Services and a former governor of Kansas; daughter of former Ohio governor John J. Gilligan
 Keith Sebelius, former member of the United States House of Representatives from Kansas from 1969 to 1981
K. Gary Sebelius, US Magistrate Judge, son of Keith Sebelius, husband of Kathleen Sebelius

See also
 Norton Downtown Historic District
 Keith Sebelius Lake

References

Further reading

External links

 City of Norton
 Lenora - Directory of Public Officials
 Norton city map, KDOT
 Norton afflicted by the Covid-19 pandemic - CNN article on Nov 28, 2020

Cities in Norton County, Kansas
Cities in Kansas
County seats in Kansas
Populated places established in 1872
1872 establishments in Kansas